Ñico Rojas (August 3, 1921 – November 22, 2008 in Havana, Cuba) was a prominent Cuban composer and guitarist, considered as one of the founders of a style of Cuban song called filin.

Biography

José Antonio Rojas, also known by the nickname of Ñico Rojas, began playing the guitar as an autodidact at a very young age.  He entered the University of Havana when he was 18 years old in order to study Hydraulic Engineering.

In the 1940s, while he was still studying at the University, Ñico became a member of a group of artists that created a new style of Cuban song, called filin, which combined Cuban rhythms with harmonies and melodies influenced by American jazz during the 1940s and 1950s.

After his graduation, Rojas established his residence in the City of Matanzas, where he dedicated himself to advance his career, contributing to the construction of numerous engineering projects, such as bridges and viaducts, as well as to teaching hydrology at the Instituto José Martí.

At the same time, Ñico Rojas continued cultivating his love of music by composing songs such as the boleros “Mi Ayer”, “Ahora sí sé que te quiero” y “Sé consciente”, which were recorded by renowned singers as Pepe Reyes, Orlando Vallejo and Miguelito Valdés; and numerous pieces for the guitar that included influences from classical music as well as from the most popular traditions. That way, Rojas was able to create a unique guitar style that showed great complexity and technical virtuosity, about which the Cuban musicologist Leonardo Acosta said: "it overflows with emotion, vitality and intellect".

Ñico Rojas used to offer concerts on an annual basis at the Cuban National Museum of Fine Arts (Museo Nacional de Bellas Artes) in Havana, which served to promote his music within the people in Havana; and he recorded his first album, Suite Cubana para Guitarra, in 1964, that was followed by another one in 1977.

The Canadian flutist an saxophonist Jane Bunnet recorded the Roja's piece called "Tony and Jesusito" in an album in 1993, that was named Jane Bunnett & the Cuban Piano Masters (Blue Note), together with the notorious Cuban pianist Frank Emilio Flynn, which included the same piece, as well as another one titled "Mi Ayer" in an album called "Barbarismo", recorded in 1997. "Mi Ayer" was also included by singer Omara Portuondo in her album "Palabras" from 1997. Ñico Rojas traveled to New York 1998 to perform at the Lincoln Center together with other prominent musicians such as Frank Emilio Flynn, Orlando "Cachaíto" López and Winton Marsalis; and the renowned guitarist Marco Tamayo recorded five of his compositions in his album titled Music from Cuba (Naxos Classical), in 2004.

The pieces for guitar of Ñico Rojas have been transcribed by prominent Cuban guitarist Martín Pedreira, as well as by José A. Perez Miranda y Ahmed Dickinson, and published by EGREM in Cuba.

Rojas received numerous distinctions in Cuba, including an award by the UNEAC (National Union of Writers and Artists of Cuba) in 1994.

See also
Music of Cuba

References

External links
 Ñico Rojas: Guajira a mi madre: https://www.youtube.com/watch?v=FP4SiPjMwaU
 Ñico Rojas: Francito y Alfonsito: https://www.youtube.com/watch?v=EHQv_9oS2gs
 Ñico Rojas: Retrato de un médico violinista: https://www.youtube.com/watch?v=wRu89OLwy5k
 Ñico Rojas: Helenita y Jorgito: https://www.youtube.com/watch?v=Dw3NP-oQuOU
 Ñico Rojas: El Manisero: https://www.youtube.com/watch?v=mN-JkYB2mII

Cuban composers
Male composers
Cuban male guitarists
1921 births
2008 deaths
People from Havana
Cuban guitarists
20th-century guitarists
20th-century male musicians
Cuban male musicians